The Red Squirrel is a 1993 Spanish drama film directed by Julio Médem, starring Emma Suárez, Nancho Novo and María Barranco.

Plot
Jota, a failed musician whose girlfriend has recently left him, is about to commit suicide by jumping off a bridge when a girl on a motorcycle, Sofía, crashes off it. Rushing to help her, he discovers she has lost her memory, even forgetting her name. After telling the paramedics and staff at the hospital that she is his girlfriend, he later tells her the same. He invents an entire identity for her, giving her the name Lisa, and a history of their relationship according to his own fantasies. With the hospital psychiatrist starting to become suspicious, he spirits her out of the hospital and away on a trip to the 'Ardilla Roja' campsite, which he claims they have been planning for some while. As their relationship becomes intimate, their behaviour sparks the suspicions of campers Antón and Carmena. It becomes clear that Lisa/Sofía's memory is not entirely missing and she is hiding her own past secrets; notably, the existence of a psychotic ex-boyfriend, Félix, who is rampaging across the country in search of her.

Cast

See also
 Mithya

References

External links
 
 
 

1993 films
1993 romantic drama films
1990s German-language films
1990s Spanish-language films
Films directed by Julio Medem
Films shot in Madrid
Films scored by Alberto Iglesias
Spanish romantic drama films
1993 multilingual films
Spanish multilingual films
1990s Spanish films